Rakhinka is a rural locality (a selo) and the administrative center of Rakhinskoye Rural Settlement, Sredneakhtubinsky District, Volgograd Oblast, Russia. The population was 2,493 as of 2010. There are 46 streets.

Geography 
Rakhinka is located on the east bank of the Volgograd Reservoir, 49 km northeast of Srednyaya Akhtuba (the district's administrative centre) by road. Verkhnepogromnoye is the nearest rural locality.

References 

Rural localities in Sredneakhtubinsky District